Independencia (better known as Colonia Independencia) is a town and district in the Guairá department of Paraguay.

The town is a tourist attraction because of its German heritage, specially in the month of October for its big Oktoberfest celebration.

Colonia Independencia received large waves of European immigrants during the 1940s and after the war, mainly from Nazi Germany and to a lesser extent from Austria, Switzerland, and Hungary.

Roads
The town is connected by PY10 to the national routes system.

References

Sources 
World Gazeteer: Paraguay – World-Gazetteer.com

Germans in Paraguay
Populated places in the Guairá Department